The Kook is an American live action short film. The film's run time is approximately 17 minutes. It was written and directed by Nat Livingston Johnson and Gregory Mitnick, also known as the directing duo Peking, and produced by Christina King. It premiered at The CFC Worldwide Short Film Festival  in Toronto, and screened as part of the 2012 Slamdance Film Festival.

Plot 
Fa is a gentle and unassuming member of an eccentric religious sect cloistered in the Catskill Mountains. On the eve of her group's scheduled "departure from Earth" Fa discovers that their leader, who appears to them as an alien hologram transmitted from a distant galaxy, is crossing signals with a man named Malcolm who lives close by. After failing to convince the others of what she's seen, Fa sets out alone into the "real world" to find Malcolm and confront the awful truth face to face.

Reception 
 Winner Best Short Film 2012 Madeira Film Festival
 Winner Best Narrative Short 2012 Macon Film Festival
 Winner Best Short Film 2012 Sunscreen Film Festival
 Winner Audience Award 2012 LES Film Festival
 Winner Best Comedy 2012 Rincon International Film Festival
 Winner Best Actress 2012 Rincon International Film Festival
 Winner Steven Susco Award 2012 Riverbend Film Festival
 Winner Best Sci-Fi 2012 Honolulu Film Awards
 Winner Best Actress Award 2011 LA Comedy Fest 
 Winner Award Of Merit 2011 Accolade Competition 
 Winner Audience Award 2011 First Run Film Festival 
 Winner Best Comedy 2011 FirstGlance Film Festival Philadelphia 
 In Competition 2011 Austin Film Festival 
 In Competition 2012 Slamdance Film Festival
 In Competition 2011 Calgary International Film Festival
 In Competition 2012 Athens International Film + Video Film Festival
 In Competition 2012 Newport Beach Film Festival
 In Competition 2012 Riverrun International Film Festival
 In Competition  2011 CFC Worldwide Short Film Festival
 Official Selection 2011 New Orleans Film Festival
 In Competition 2011 LA Shorts Fest

References

External links 
 
 

2011 films
American short films
2010s English-language films